is a railway station on the Karatsu Line operated by JR Kyushu located in Taku, Saga Prefecture, Japan.

Lines

Station layout 
The station consists of an island platform serving two tracks. The station building is a hashigami structure where the passenger facilities are placed on a bridge which spans the tracks. Besides giving access to the island platform, the second level of the bridge houses a waiting area and a ticket window. The bridge is also used as a free access for pedestrians to cross from the north side to the south side of the station. Next to the station are community facilities and shops.

Management of the station has been outsourced to the JR Kyushu Tetsudou Eigyou Co., a wholly owned subsidiary of JR Kyushu specialising in station services. It staffs the ticket window which is equipped with a POS machine but does not have a Midori no Madoguchi facility.

Adjacent stations

History 
The Karatsu Kogyo Railway had opened a track from Miyoken (now ) which, by 13 June 1899, had reached . The track was extended further east, with Taku (at the time named  opening as the new eastern terminus on 25 December 1899. On 23 February 1902, the company, now renamed the Karatsu Railway, merged with the Kyushu Railway which undertook the next phase of expansion. When the Kyushu Railway was nationalized on 1 July 1907, Japanese Government Railways (JGR) took over control of the station. On 12 October 1909, the line which served the station was designated the Karatsu Line. On 1 April 1934, the station was renamed Taku. With the privatization of Japanese National Railways (JNR), the successor of JGR, on 1 April 1987, control of the station passed to JR Kyushu.

Passenger statistics
In fiscal 2016, the station was used by an average of 360 passengers daily (boarding passengers only), and it ranked 282nd among the busiest stations of JR Kyushu.

Surrounding area
National Route 203
Kita-Taku Post Office
Midorigaoka Elementary School
Taku Seibyō

References

External links
Taku Station (JR Kyushu)

Railway stations in Saga Prefecture
Stations of Kyushu Railway Company
Karatsu Line
Railway stations in Japan opened in 1899